was a Japanese domain of the Edo period, located in Settsu Province. It was founded by Aoki Kazushige, who had served as a vassal of Toyotomi Hideyori, but was granted Asada after the Osaka Campaign, by Tokugawa Ieyasu. The domain was rated at 12,000 koku, and remained under the rule of the Aoki clan until the Meiji era.

List of daimyō

Aoki clan (Tozama; 12,000 koku)

Kazushige
Shigekane
Shigemasa
Shigenori
Kazutsune
Kazukuni
Chikatsune
Kazuyoshi
Kazutsura
Kazusada
Shigetatsu
Kazuoki
Kazuhiro
Shigeyoshi

References
 Genealogy of the lords of Asada

Domains of Japan
Kansai region